This is a list of notable RGB hardware color palettes used on 16-bit computers, which were primarily manufactured from 1985 to 1995. Due to mixed-bit architectures, the n-bit distinction is not always a strict categorization.

{|
| Sample image
| Color test chart
| 12-bit, 4096-color palette
| 15-bit, 32768-color palette
|-
| 
| 
| 
| 
|}

Atari

ST series
The Atari ST series has a digital-to-analog converter of 3-bits, eight levels per RGB channel, featuring a 9-bit RGB palette (512 colors).
Depending on the (proprietary) monitor type attached, it displays one of the 320×200, 16-colors and 640×200, 4-colors modes with the color monitor, or the high resolution 640×400 black and white mode with the monochrome monitor.

{|
|2 colors
|4 colors
|16 colors
|-
|
|
|
|}

2-color mode color values:
{| class="wikitable" style="color: white;"
|-
| style="color:white; background:black; width:8.5pc;"| 0 – black
| style="color:black; background:white; width:8.5pc;"| 1 – [user-defined]
|}

The STE series has a digital-to-analog converter of 4-bits, sixteen levels per RGB channel, featuring a 12-bit RGB palette (4096 colors) (similar to the Commodore Amiga).

Commodore

Amiga OCS
The Original Chip Set (OCS) of the Commodore Amiga features a 12-bit RGB, 4,096-color palette. As the Amiga Copper programmable graphics coprocessor is capable of changing color lookup table entries on the fly during display, in practice the number of distinct colors visible on-screen may exceed static color lookup table sizes documented here.

5-bit
The picture is divided in a series of bit planes, between 1 and 6 for horizontal resolutions of 320 (or up to 384 with overscan), and between 1 and 4 for horizontal resolutions of 640 (or up to 768 with overscan). For either horizontal resolution, the vertical resolution is either 200 (or up to 240 with overscan), or 400 (or up to 480 with overscan) if interlaced, for NTSC-compatible video modes; or 256 (or up to 288 with overscan), or 512 (or up to 576 with overscan) if interlaced, for PAL-compatible video modes. The color lookup table has up to 32 entries. So the different indexed color modes are from 1 to 5 bits pixel depth, 2-, 4-, 8-, 16- or 32-color out of 4,096.

{|
|2 colors
|4 colors
|8 colors
|16 colors
|32 colors
|-
|
|
|
|
|
|}

6-bit
When the sixth bit-plane is used, two extra color modes can be set: Extra Half-Brite (EHB) and Hold-And-Modify (HAM).

In the EHB mode, when the sixth bit is set to on for any given pixel, the display hardware halves the brightness of said pixel. This allows the Amiga to display 64 colors instead of the standard 32, with the caveat being that the 32 extra colors cannot be arbitrarily selected, and must be darker versions of those already being displayed on screen 

In the HAM mode, the two higher bits of the 6-bits pixels are used as a four state command. Three of the states changes only the red, green or blue component of the pixel respect of the precedent in the scan line, and hold the other two RGB components. The new value for the modified color component is in the four lower bits. The remaining command state forces the pixel value to be one of the 16 first values of the palette, whose indice is in the four lower bits of the pixel. So it is very important to have a well selected palette, or the color will spread easily among consecutive pixels in the scan line of the image. This mode can display all of the 4,096 colors simultaneously.

{|
|64 colors (EHB mode)
|4096 colors (HAM mode)
|-
|
|
|}

Amiga ECS

Apple

Apple IIGS
Apple IIGS, along with full compatible graphic modes with the Apple II, features a custom Video Graphics Chip (VGC) which supports a 12-bit RGB, 4,096-color palette. It has an extended set of 320×200 and 640×200 graphic modes, (called Super High-Res modes by Apple) with different (and a bit complex) color modes:
 320×200 with 16 palettes of 16 selected colors out of 4,096 each. Every single scan line can be assigned to one of the sixteen palettes, so it can have up to 16×16=256 different simultaneous colors (although some common colors like black and white are usually shared among the different palettes, giving fewer than 256 total different colors). The most simple way to use this mode is having a unique 16-color selection for the entire screen and assign it to all scan lines. Here are shown the sample image both using a single shared palette and using all the 16 palettes (in this case, by dividing the image into 16 strips):

 
 640×200 with 16 palettes of 8 selected colors out of 4,096 each. Every single scan line can be assigned to one of the sixteen palettes, so it can have up to 8×16=128 different simultaneous colors (usually less due to shared colors). In a single scan line, even column pixels can have one of the first four colors of the line's assigned palette, and odd column pixels one of the last four colors of the eight. The most simple way to use this mode is having a unique 8-color selection for the entire screen with four duplicate colors (the same to both even and odd pixel columns) and assign it to all scan lines. Here are shown the sample image both with a single shared custom 4-color palette and with a single 8-color palette (black, blue, yellow, white, black (again), red, green, white (again)) to produce 13 dithered-by-hardware colors, ("dark blue", "dark yellow", "gray", "dark red", "magenta", "orange", "light red", "dark green", "cyan", "lime green", "light green", "light blue", and "light yellow") plus pure black and white. The last was the Apple IIGS Finder default mode and palette.

 

Also, along with the one of 16 palettes, to each scan line the Apple IIGS VGC is able to assign individual 320 or 640 horizontal resolution independently. The closest output would be:

Sharp

Sharp X68000
The Sharp X68000, released in 1987, uses a 16-bit RGB palette. All 65,536 colors can be displayed simultaneously in resolutions up to 512x512, or 16 out of 65,536 colors at the highest resolution of 1024x1024.

{| style="border-style: none" border="0" cellpadding="0"
|-
|| 
|| 
|}

IBM PC/AT and compatible systems

EGA
The Enhanced Graphics Adapter (EGA) supports all CGA modes and add three more: two 320×200 and 640×200 graphic modes, both with the full CGA 16-color palette (intended to be used with the same "digital RGB" CGA color monitor of 200 scan lines) and an extra 640×350 graphic mode with 16 colors chosen from a 6-bit RGB (64 colors) palette for what IBM then called an "analog RGB" type monitor.

The word analog means here that the RGB signals can have more than the bare two possible levels 0 and 1; (as the so-called —by IBM— "digital RGB" CGA monitor type has) despite of its name, colors are produced digitally, so there exist binary (quantized) steps for every primary RGB signal (two bits, four levels per primary, in this case). Thus, the EGA signal from the computer to this kind of monitor had two wires for each primary red, green and blue. IBM developed a true analog video interface later, for the more advanced MCGA and VGA display adapters and monitors (and earlier, for the Professional Graphics Controller, announced simultaneously with the EGA) which are unrelated to (and incompatible with) the EGA "analog" monitors; see the next section.

Some early EGA cards shipped with only 64 KB of video memory—the nominal was 128 KB, up to a maximum of 256 KB to allow more screen pages in memory.  With only 64 KB, the EGA 640×350 graphic mode provides only four colors.  4-color 640×350 graphics was never a proper mode by itself (merely a conditional downgrade of the 640×350 16-color mode) and therefore was not popular.

Monochrome "analog" monitors also existed for EGA. The colors are then mapped internally to the correspondent luminance gray, (the sum of the 30% of the red signal, the 59% of the green and the 11% of the blue) giving a 16-shades from a 64-grayscale palette. "Positive" class monitors inverts the signal, providing that the default EGA colors for text modes (black background and white foreground) displays reversed, (white background and black foreground) as if were a printed document.

{| class="wikitable" style="text-align: center"
|+ EGA color palette
|- style="color:white;" 
| style="background:#000; width:3pc;" title="#000"| 0x00
| style="background:#005; width:3pc;" title="#005"| 0x01
| style="background:#500; width:3pc;" title="#505"| 0x02
| style="background:#505; width:3pc;" title="#505"| 0x03
| style="background:#050; width:3pc;" title="#050"| 0x04
| style="background:#055; width:3pc;" title="#055"| 0x05
| style="background:#550; width:3pc;" title="#550"| 0x06
| style="background:#555; width:3pc;" title="#555"| 0x07
|- style="color:white;" 
| style="background:#00a; width:3pc;" title="#00A"| 0x08
| style="background:#00f; width:3pc;" title="#00F"| 0x09
| style="background:#50a; width:3pc;" title="#50A"| 0x0A
| style="background:#50f; width:3pc;" title="#50F"| 0x0B
| style="background:#05a; width:3pc;" title="#05A"| 0x0C
| style="background:#05f; width:3pc;" title="#05F"| 0x0D
| style="background:#55a; width:3pc;" title="#55A"| 0x0E
| style="background:#55f; width:3pc;" title="#55F"| 0x0F
|-
| style="color:white; background:#a00; width:3pc;" title="#A00"| 0x10
| style="color:white; background:#a05; width:3pc;" title="#A05"| 0x11
| style="color:white; background:#f00; width:3pc;" title="#F00"| 0x12
| style="color:white; background:#f05; width:3pc;" title="#F05"| 0x13
| style="color:white; background:#a50; width:3pc;" title="#A50"| 0x14
| style="color:white; background:#a55; width:3pc;" title="#A55"| 0x15
| style="color:white; background:#f50; width:3pc;" title="#F50"| 0x16
| style="color:black; background:#f55; width:3pc;" title="#F55"| 0x17
|-
| style="color:white; background:#a0a; width:3pc;" title="#A0A"| 0x18
| style="color:white; background:#a0f; width:3pc;" title="#A0F"| 0x19
| style="color:white; background:#f0a; width:3pc;" title="#F0A"| 0x1A
| style="color:white; background:#f0f; width:3pc;" title="#F0F"| 0x1B
| style="color:white; background:#a5a; width:3pc;" title="#A5A"| 0x1C
| style="color:white; background:#a5f; width:3pc;" title="#A5F"| 0x1D
| style="color:black; background:#f5a; width:3pc;" title="#F5A"| 0x1E
| style="color:black; background:#f5f; width:3pc;" title="#F5F"| 0x1F
|-
| style="color:white; background:#0a0; width:3pc;" title="#0A0"| 0x20
| style="color:white; background:#0a5; width:3pc;" title="#0A5"| 0x21
| style="color:white; background:#5a0; width:3pc;" title="#5A0"| 0x22
| style="color:black; background:#5a5; width:3pc;" title="#5A5"| 0x23
| style="color:white; background:#0f0; width:3pc;" title="#0F0"| 0x24
| style="color:black; background:#0f5; width:3pc;" title="#0F5"| 0x25
| style="color:black; background:#5f0; width:3pc;" title="#5F0"| 0x26
| style="color:black; background:#5f5; width:3pc;" title="#5F5"| 0x27
|-
| style="color:white; background:#0aa; width:3pc;" title="#0AA"| 0x28
| style="color:white; background:#0af; width:3pc;" title="#0AF"| 0x29
| style="color:black; background:#5aa; width:3pc;" title="#5AA"| 0x2A
| style="color:black; background:#5af; width:3pc;" title="#5AF"| 0x2B
| style="color:black; background:#0fa; width:3pc;" title="#0FA"| 0x2C
| style="color:black; background:#0ff; width:3pc;" title="#0FF"| 0x2D
| style="color:black; background:#5fa; width:3pc;" title="#5FA"| 0x2E
| style="color:black; background:#5ff; width:3pc;" title="#5FF"| 0x2F
|- style="color:black;" 
| style="background:#aa0; width:3pc;" title="#AA0"| 0x30
| style="background:#aa5; width:3pc;" title="#AA5"| 0x31
| style="background:#fa0; width:3pc;" title="#FA0"| 0x32
| style="background:#fa5; width:3pc;" title="#FA5"| 0x33
| style="background:#af0; width:3pc;" title="#AF0"| 0x34
| style="background:#af5; width:3pc;" title="#AF5"| 0x35
| style="background:#ff0; width:3pc;" title="#FF0"| 0x36
| style="background:#ff5; width:3pc;" title="#FF5"| 0x37
|- style="color:black;" 
| style="background:#aaa; width:3pc;" title="#AAA"| 0x38
| style="background:#aaf; width:3pc;" title="#AAF"| 0x39
| style="background:#faa; width:3pc;" title="#FAA"| 0x3A
| style="background:#faf; width:3pc;" title="#FAF"| 0x3B
| style="background:#afa; width:3pc;" title="#AFA"| 0x3C
| style="background:#aff; width:3pc;" title="#AFF"| 0x3D
| style="background:#ffa; width:3pc;" title="#FFA"| 0x3E
| style="background:#fff; width:3pc;" title="#FFF"| 0x3F
|}
Note: The colors underlined exist in the CGA palette; as well as it is used as default 16-color EGA color palette.

PGC (Professional Graphics Controller)
The Professional Graphics Controller used a 12-bit RGB palette (4096 colors), from which 256 could be displayed. Targeted at the CAD market this mode has limited software support, although some clone boards exist.

MCGA and VGA
The Multi-Color Graphics Array (MCGA) and Video Graphics Array (VGA) used a 6-bits per channel, 64 level digital-to-analog converter to give an 18-bit RGB palette (262,144 colors), from which can be selected any 2, 16, or 256 at a time. They both provided full compatibility with CGA modes, while VGA included all the EGA modes as well as the MCGA modes. When connected to analog monochrome monitors, they offered 64 levels of grey. Some of the first portable PCs featured a flat monochrome plasma display with a VGA in shades of red.

{|
|16 colors
|256 colors
|64 shades on grayscale display
|64 shades on red plasma display
|-
|
|
|
|
|}

8514/A and XGA

The 8514/A uses the 18-bit RGB palette from which the user could select any 256 at a time in both 640×480 and 1024×768 graphic modes. It does not support compatibility with VGA modes, but a VGA card is usually already installed and bridged to the 8514/A to provide a single output cable for a single monitor which can display any of all VGA and 8514/A possible modes.

The Extended Graphics Array (XGA) supports all 8514/A modes plus an 800×600 16-bit RGB Highcolor mode, with 65,536 simultaneous colors on screen.

Super VGA (SVGA)

Enhanced clones of the IBM VGA, known as Super VGA, (SVGA) support 256 simultaneous colors in 640×480 and higher pixel resolutions (800×600, 1024×768) in both 16 and 256 picked colors from the VGA 18-bit RGB palette, depending on the model and the manufacturer. Also, some SVGA cards support 15- and 16-bit RGB Highcolor modes, with 32,768 or 65,536 simultaneous colors on screen in 640×480 and higher resolutions. Some later models reach the 24-bit RGB true-color modes.

In the 1990s, most manufacturers adhered to the VESA BIOS Extensions (VBE), used for enabling standard support for advanced video modes (at high resolutions and color depths).

They are the direct predecessors, not the IBM 8514/A nor XGA, of actual graphic display PC hardware.

Super XGA (SXGA)

32-bit mixed architecture

IBM PC/AT and compatible systems

XGA
See 8514/A and XGA above

SVGA
See Super VGA above

References

See also
 List of color palettes
 List of software palettes
 List of video game console palettes
 List of monochrome and RGB color formats
 List of 8-bit computer hardware palettes
 Palette (computing)
 Indexed color
 Color Lookup Table
 Color depth

Computer graphics
Color depths
Computing output devices